Live from Sydney to Vegas is the second video album by the Black Eyed Peas. It was released on November 23, 2006, by A&M Records, Interscope Records and will.i.am Music Group. Filmed during their world tour The Monkey Business Tour (2005–2006), its technology enables the viewers to switch back and forth between the October 3, 2005 show at the Sydney SuperDome and the June 3, 2005 show at the Hard Rock Hotel and Casino's The Joint.

Release
In the United States, Live from Sydney to Vegas was released on December 5, 2006, by A&M Records, Interscope Records and will.i.am Music Group. The DVD featured a technology which allowed its viewers, when watching performances of "Dum Diddly", "Don't Lie", "Where Is the Love?" and "Don't Phunk with My Heart" during the Sydney concert, to simultaneously see them during the Las Vegas concert by pressing "enter". In the United Kingdom, the Sydney concert premiered on 4Music on September 9, 2009. The concert's length was shortened to an hour, hence several tracks and explicit lyrics were omitted from the broadcast.

Track listing

Charts

Certifications

Release history

References

External links
 Official website
 

2006 video albums
Live video albums
2006 live albums
The Black Eyed Peas video albums
Hard Rock Hotel and Casino (Las Vegas)